This is a list of episodes for the sixth season (1955–56) of the television version of The Jack Benny Program.

Episodes

References
 
 

1955 American television seasons
1956 American television seasons
Jack 06